Sweden competed at the 2018 European Championships in Berlin, Germany; and Glasgow, United Kingdom from 2 to 12 August 2018 in 7 sports.

Medallists

|  style="text-align:left; width:75%; vertical-align:top;"|

|  style="text-align:left; width:25%; vertical-align:top;"|

Athletics

A total of 67 athletes were selected to the team.

Men
Track & road events

Field events

Combined events – Decathlon

Women
Track & road events

Field events

Combined events – Heptathlon

Aquatics

Diving
Men

Women

Mixed

Swimming
Men

Women

Mixed

Cycling

BMX

Mountain biking

Road

Golf

Sweden was represented by seven teams: two men's, three women's, and two mixed.

Men

Women

Mixed

Gymnastics

Men

Women

Rowing

A total of four athletes have been selected to the Swedish team.

Triathlon

References

External links
European Championships

2018 in Swedish sport
2018
Nations at the 2018 European Championships